Bradley Cole Underwood (born December 14, 1963) is the current head coach for the Illinois men's basketball team.  Previously, he served as head coach at Oklahoma State, Stephen F. Austin, Dodge City Community College, and Daytona Beach Community College and assistant coach at Western Illinois, Kansas State, and South Carolina.

Playing career
Underwood played as a guard for Hardin-Simmons University during his freshman year from 1982 to 1983 and later transferred to Independence Community College. During his sophomore year, Underwood averaged 17 points a game and led Independence to a second place finish in the NJCAA Men's Division I Basketball Championship game. As a sophomore at Independence, Underwood took a recruiting visit to Oklahoma State University where Bill Self, then an Oklahoma State basketball player, was his host. Days later, Underwood decided to attend Kansas State University, where he would play under head coach Jack Hartman.

Early coaching career
Underwood began his coaching career as a graduate assistant at Hardin-Simmons during the 1986–87 campaign. He continued his coaching career as the head coach of Dodge City Community College, where he led the Conquistadors to a 62–60 record from 1988 to 1993. In 1993, he joined Jim Kerwin's staff at Western Illinois, with whom he spent 10 years as an assistant. He led Daytona Beach Community College to a 70–24 record from 2003 to 2006 and was twice named the Mid-Florida Conference Coach of the year. He served as assistant coach under Bob Huggins and Frank Martin at Kansas State from 2006 to 2012. In 2012, Martin left to become head coach at South Carolina, and Underwood followed him to Columbia as his associate head coach.

Head coaching career

Stephen F. Austin
On April 30, 2013, Underwood was hired as head coach of Stephen F. Austin. He replaced Danny Kaspar, who left after 13 seasons to become the head coach of Texas State. According to athletic director Robert Hill, "Brad Underwood brings years of experience to SFA and has coached at the highest levels of Division I basketball. All of this plus his knowledge of the game and ability to recruit makes him the perfect hire for our men's basketball program. He has great plans on how we can make this program even better."

In his first season at the helm, Stephen F. Austin captured the Southland Conference regular-season championship going a perfect 18–0 in conference play. He was named Southland Coach of the Year. SFA was awarded the Southland Conference automatic berth to the 2014 NCAA Division I men's basketball tournament where they upset VCU in the round of 64, before eventually falling to UCLA.

Underwood's third season saw him win the Southland Conference tournament again and an automatic bid to the NCAA tournament as a 14 seed. He then led the Lumberjacks to an upset victory over the third-seeded West Virginia Mountaineers coached by Bob Huggins, with whom he worked as an assistant at Kansas State.  Stephen F. Austin had a 75–70 lead over sixth-seeded Notre Dame with two minutes to play in the second round before the Irish scored six straight points and won on a tip-in with 1.2 seconds left.

Oklahoma State

On March 21, 2016, Underwood was hired as head coach of Oklahoma State. He replaced Travis Ford, who was fired after a 12–20 regular-season record. He led the Cowboys to a 20–13 record in his only season as head coach, ending with a loss to Michigan on March 17, 2017, in the NCAA tournament. In 2020, Oklahoma State's basketball program received penalties from the NCAA—including a ban on postseason play in 2020-2021—as punishment for violations committed during Underwood's tenure.

University of Illinois

On March 18, 2017, Underwood was hired as head coach of Illinois, replacing John Groce. Underwood signed a six year contract through 2023 worth $18 million that includes two retention bonuses. On March 2, 2020 it was announced that Underwood and his assistants had received extensions. Underwood's contract was extended until the 2026 season and moves his base salary to $3.4 million, which ranks in the upper quartile of the Big Ten Conference.

Illinois finished the 2020-2021 regular season 16-4 in Big Ten play, 23-6 overall. Illinois finished in second place in Big Ten play to Michigan, who finished with a higher winning percentage at 14-3. On Friday, March 12, 2021, Illinois started Big Ten tournament play. Illinois first played Rutgers, winning 90-68. Illinois moved on to the Semifinals Saturday against Iowa, winning 82-71. In the Tournament Final on Sunday, Illinois went on to beat Ohio State, 91-88 in overtime. Underwood led the Illini to their first Big Ten tournament title since the 2004-2005 season. Illinois secured a number one seed in the Midwest region of the 2021 NCAA men's basketball tournament. Their first matchup was against 16-seed Drexel on Friday, March 19 at Indiana Farmers Coliseum; the Fighting Illini defeated the Drexel Dragons 78-49. In their second matchup, the Illini fell to the 8th-seeded Loyola (Chicago) Ramblers, 71-58.

Head coaching record

Junior college

College

 ^abcde In the Spring of 2019, The Stephen F. Austin athletics department discovered that the process by which student-athletes were being certified as academically eligible was not properly accounting for all NCAA requirements from 2013 thru 2019.  This error resulted in 82 student-athletes competing while ineligible for SFA in the sports of football, men's basketball, baseball, volleyball, softball, women's golf, men's and women's track & field and men's cross country.  As a result, Stephen F. Austin vacated 117 men's basketball victories from 2014 thru 2019 including all 29 wins during the 2014-2015 basketball season and all 28 wins during the 2015-2016 basketball season.

Personal
A native of McPherson, Kansas, Underwood attended Kansas State University and lettered on the basketball team between 1984 and 1986. He graduated from Kansas State with a bachelor's degree in radio and television communications in 1986. He is married to Susan Underwood and has three children: Tyler, Katie, and Ashley.

Tyler played at Stephen F. Austin during the 2015-2016 season which he redshirted. He then transferred to Oklahoma State for the 2016-2017 season. He then transferred to the University of Illinois from 2017-2021. As a senior he played in seven games on the season after making debut Jan. 7 at Northwestern, made a 3-pointer and had 1 rebound in Big Ten tournament win over Rutgers, grabbed one rebound in win at No. 2 Michigan, and made first basket of the season in Nebraska win. Tyler is currently on staff with his dad at the University of Illinois.

References

1963 births
Living people
Basketball coaches from Kansas
Basketball players from Kansas
Hardin–Simmons Cowboys basketball players
Illinois Fighting Illini men's basketball coaches
Junior college men's basketball coaches in the United States
Kansas State Wildcats men's basketball coaches
Kansas State Wildcats men's basketball players
Oklahoma State Cowboys basketball coaches
People from McPherson, Kansas
South Carolina Gamecocks men's basketball coaches
Stephen F. Austin Lumberjacks basketball coaches
Western Illinois Leathernecks men's basketball coaches
Guards (basketball)
Independence Pirates men's basketball players